Raaja is a 1975 Indian Bollywood film directed by K. Shankar. It stars Rishi Kapoor (in double role), Sulakshana Pandit, Prem Chopra, Asrani, Aruna Irani, Jagdeep among others. The music was composed by Rahul Dev Burman.

Plot
The story revolves around twin brothers Raaja and Ram. Raaja is conman and Ram was a CID inspector. They both realize that the older sister they thought dead is in fact alive, whereupon they embark on a quest to save her from the lecher who has her in his thrall. They also reveals that she is under Sher Singh who was the bandit. Raja false love with beautiful girl Rani as comparison of their name. She gets confused between both brothers so Ram grows moustache socan find easily who is her lover.

When Ram goes to find her sisters mystery he gets killed by the Sher Singh's goons. Now Taaja has to find her sister and also avenge his brother's death. Raaja takes help of police to identify the criminals and takes help of police. Police tells Raja that we should  prove you as dead Ram is alive. Raja disguise as Ram to found the criminals and bring them to the justice.

Raaja creates a team of police to rescue her sister from Sher Singh. They successfully finished the Sher Singh and his gang and Raaja rescued her sister and brought to the hospital she was in critical condition. But She cannot survive she dies. After that Rani and Raja both gets married.

Cast 
Rishi Kapoor as Raaja/Inspector Ram (dual role)
Sulakshana Pandit as Rani
Prem Chopra as Sher Singh
Asrani as Chander
Aruna Irani as Parvati
David Abraham as Dayaram Divecha
Swaraj Kumar Gupta	as College Drama Committee
Jagdeep as Producer Malpani
Shashi Kiran as Chander's friend
Om Prakash as Rani's Father
Ghanshyam Rohera as Chander's Friend

Soundtrack 
Lyrics: Anand Bakshi

External links
 

1970s Hindi-language films
Films directed by K. Shankar
Films scored by R. D. Burman